Andrew Michael Gamble  (born 15 August 1947) is a British scholar of politics. He was Professor of Politics at the University of Cambridge and Fellow of Queens' College from 2007 to 2014. He was a member of the Department of Politics at the University of Sheffield (1973–2007), for many years as a professor and rejoined the department in 2014.

A pupil of Brighton College, he studied economics at Queens' College, Cambridge, before gaining his Master of Arts degree in political theory from the University of Durham. He then returned to Gonville and Caius College, Cambridge, for his doctorate in social and political sciences, which he received in 1975.

While at Sheffield University, he was a founder, member and Director of the Political Economy Research Centre (PERC), Chairman of the Department of Politics (twice), and Pro-Vice Chancellor of the university. He received his Chair in Politics in 1986.

In 2005 he was awarded the Sir Isaiah Berlin Award for Lifetime Contribution to Political Studies by the PSA. His 2003 book, Between Europe and America, won the W. J. M. Mackenzie prize for the best book published in political science in 2003. He is co-editor (with the former Labour MP Tony Wright) of the academic journal The Political Quarterly, and he also sits on the editorial board of another academic journal, Representation. The main themes of his recent research have been asset-based welfare and "Anglo-America". His most recent book, an analysis of the politics of recession and capitalist crises, is entitled The Spectre at the Feast.

Honours
Gamble was elected a Fellow of the British Academy (FBA) in 2000, and a Fellow of the Academy of Social Sciences (FAcSS) in 2002.

Published works

Single-authored books:
Can the Welfare State Survive? (2016)
Crisis Without End? The Unravelling of Western Prosperity (2014)
The Spectre at the Feast (2009)
Between Europe and America: The Future of British Politics (2003)
Politics and Fate (2000)
Hayek: The Iron Cage of Liberty (1996)
The Free Economy and the Strong State (1988, 2nd edition 1994)
Britain in Decline (1981, 4th Edition 1994)
An Introduction to Modern Social and Political Thought (1981)
The Conservative Nation (1974)

Co-authored books:
Ideas, Interests & Consequences (1989)
The British Party System and Economic Policy 1945–1983 (with S. A. Walkland) (1984)
Capitalism in Crisis (with Paul Walton) (1976)
From Alienation to Surplus Value (with Paul Walton) (1976)

Books edited/ co-edited:
Labour, the State, Social Movements and the Challenge of Neo-liberal Globalisation (2007)
 Restating the State? (2004)
The Political Economy of the Company (2000)
Marxism and Social Science (1999)
The New Social Democracy (1999)
Fundamentals in British Politics (1999)
Stakeholder Capitalism (1997)
Regionalism & World Order (1996)
The Social Economy and the Democratic State (1989)
Developments in British Politics (series 1-7-1983-2003)

References

External links
 The Political Quarterly (journal edited by Andrew Gamble and Tony Wright MP)
 Staff profile, Sheffield University 
 review of Politics and Fate by Bernard Crick
 recent paper on Anglo-America
 April 2007 PSA conference paper, on Hegemony and Empire: British Exceptionalism and the Myth of Anglo-America
 PERC website

1947 births
Living people
Fellows of the Academy of Social Sciences
Academics of the University of Cambridge
Alumni of Queens' College, Cambridge
Alumni of Gonville and Caius College, Cambridge
British political scientists
Fellows of Queens' College, Cambridge
Fellows of the British Academy
Alumni of Durham University Graduate Society
Deutscher Memorial Prize winners